Zack Williams may refer to:

 Zack Williams (actor) (1884–1958), American actor
 Zack Williams (American football) (born 1988), American football center
 Zack Williams (Canadian football) (born 1997), Canadian football offensive lineman

See also
 Tunde Zack-Williams (Alfred Babatunde Zack-Williams, born 1945), British sociologist and Africanist